Alison Van Uytvanck was the defending champion and successfully defended her title, defeating Markéta Vondroušová in the final, 1–6, 7–5, 6–2.

Seeds

Draw

Finals

Top half

Bottom half

Qualifying

Seeds

Qualifiers

Lucky loser

Draw

First qualifier

Second qualifier

Third qualifier

Fourth qualifier

Fifth qualifier

Sixth qualifier

References

External links
 Main draw
 Qualifying draw

Hungarian Ladies Open - Singles
Hungarian Ladies Open
Lad